Baker Island is an island in the Alexander Archipelago of southeastern Alaska, United States. It lies off the central west coast of Prince of Wales Island. Its closest significant island neighbors are Noyes Island to its northwest, Lulu Island directly to its north, and Suemez Island across Bucareli Bay to its southeast. The smaller San Juan Bautista Island and St. Ignace Island separate it from Prince of Wales Island and its nearest community, Craig.

The first European to sight the island was Aleksei Chirikov in 1741. It was named by William Healy Dall of the U.S. Coast and Geodetic Survey in 1879 after Marcus Baker (1849–1903).

References

Islands of the Alexander Archipelago
Islands of Prince of Wales–Hyder Census Area, Alaska
Uninhabited islands of Alaska
Islands of Alaska
Islands of Unorganized Borough, Alaska